BOB (4-bromo-2,5,beta-trimethoxyphenethylamine) is a lesser-known psychedelic drug.  It is the beta-methoxy analog of 2C-B. BOB was first synthesized by Alexander Shulgin. In his book PiHKAL, the dosage range is listed as 10–20 mg, and the duration listed as 10–20 hours. BOB produces an altered state of consciousness, tinnitus, a pleasant tingling throughout the body, and a sense of awareness. Very little data exists about the pharmacological properties, metabolism, and toxicity of BOB.

Legality

United Kingdom
This substance is a Class A drug in the Drugs controlled by the UK Misuse of Drugs Act.

See also 
 BOD
 BOH
 BOHD
 Bk-2C-B
 β-Methyl-2C-B
 2C-B-aminorex
 Phenethylamine

References

Psychedelic phenethylamines
Phenylethanolamine ethers
Designer drugs